Éva Takács (1780–1845), was a Hungarian publisher, writer and feminist. She was the first female publisher in Hungary, and active as a progressive feminist and a theorist of women's education. She was the mother of Teréz Karacs.

References

1780 births
1845 deaths
Hungarian women's rights activists
Hungarian feminists
19th-century Hungarian writers
19th-century Hungarian businesspeople